Jorge Rios (born 21 February 1959) is a Cuban sports shooter. He competed in the men's 10 metre running target event at the 1992 Summer Olympics.

References

1959 births
Living people
Cuban male sport shooters
Olympic shooters of Cuba
Shooters at the 1992 Summer Olympics
Place of birth missing (living people)
Pan American Games medalists in shooting
Pan American Games gold medalists for Cuba
Shooters at the 1991 Pan American Games
20th-century Cuban people